Robin Godfrey Hodder (1 October 1937 – 19 March 2006) was a field hockey player from Australia, who won the bronze medal with the Men's National Team at the 1964 Summer Olympics in Tokyo, Japan.

External links
 
Robin Hodder's profile at Sports Reference.com

1937 births
Australian male field hockey players
Olympic field hockey players of Australia
Field hockey players at the 1964 Summer Olympics
Olympic bronze medalists for Australia
Olympic medalists in field hockey
2006 deaths
Medalists at the 1964 Summer Olympics